Tazeh Kand-e Niq (also Romanized as Tāzeh Kand-e Nīq; also known as Tāzeh Kand) is a village in Dodangeh Rural District, Hurand District, Ahar County, East Azerbaijan Province, Iran. At the 2006 census, its population was 137, in 26 families.

References 

Populated places in Ahar County